Ecuador is the Spanish word for the equator, it can refer to:
Ecuador, a country in South America
"Ecuador" (song), by German DJ/Production team Sash! and featuring Adrian Rodriguez
Ecuador metro station in Santiago, Chile
Volcán Ecuador, a volcano of the Galápagos Islands in the Pacific Ocean

Equador can refer to:
Confederação do Equador, a short-lived separatist state in Brazil
Equador, Rio Grande do Norte, a Brazilian city

See also
Equator (disambiguation)